In probability theory, a hyper-Erlang distribution is a continuous probability distribution which takes a particular Erlang distribution Ei with probability pi. A hyper-Erlang distributed random variable X has a probability density function given by

where each pi > 0 with the pi summing to 1 and each of the Eli being an Erlang distribution with li stages each of which has parameter λi.

See also
 Phase-type distribution

References

 

Continuous distributions